Calliostoma babelicum is a species of sea snail, a marine gastropod mollusk in the family Calliostomatidae.

Some authors place this taxon in the subgenus Calliostoma (Kombologion)

Description
The height of the shell attains 10 mm.

Distribution
This marine species occurs off Japan.

References

 Higo, S., Callomon, P. & Goto, Y. (1999). Catalogue and bibliography of the marine shell-bearing Mollusca of Japan Osaka: Elle Scientific Publications. 749 pp.

External links
 

babelicum
Gastropods described in 1961